The 1983 Notre Dame Fighting Irish football team represented the University of Notre Dame in the 1983 NCAA Division I-A football season. The team was coached by Gerry Faust and played its home games at Notre Dame Stadium in South Bend, Indiana.

Notre Dame made it to the Liberty Bowl where they faced Boston College and their prized quarterback Doug Flutie. Boston College scored first on a 13-yard touchdown pass but missed the extra point. Notre Dame came back as Allen Pinkett and Chris Smith each rushed for 100-plus yards, while Pinkett scored two touchdowns as Notre Dame beat Boston College, 19–18, to win their first bowl game since the 1979 Cotton Bowl.

Schedule

Roster

Game summaries

Purdue

    
    
    
    
    
    
    
    
    

Allen Pinkett 15 Rush, 115 Yds

Colorado

Source:

USC

Source: 
    
    
    
    
    
    

The game came to be known as the "Green Jerseys II" game.  Notre Dame snapped a five-game losing streak to USC as Allen Pinkett rushed 21 times for 122 yards, his fourth straight 100-yard game and the first Irish player to do so since Jim Stone in 1980. "We felt could have beat USC in blue. We felt we could have beat them in T-shirts," said Pinkett. The game took place six years to the day from the original "Green Jersey" game in 1977 but head coach Gerry Faust had already made the decision to wear the jerseys over the summer.

Team players drafted into the NFL

Awards and honors
Allen Pinkett finished 16th in voting for the Heisman Trophy.
Former Fighting Irish players Bill Fischer  and Bill Shakespeare was inducted into the College Football Hall of Fame

References

Notre Dame
Notre Dame Fighting Irish football seasons
Liberty Bowl champion seasons
Notre Dame Fighting Irish football